Living Language, an imprint of Random House, LLC, is a foreign language self-study publisher. Living Language publishes a number of courses in languages such as  French, German, Italian, Persian, Arabic, etc.

History 
Living Language was originally developed in 1946 by foreign language education experts to teach overseas-bound service personnel and diplomats. In recent years, the imprint has expanded its publishing program to include audio-only CD courses, online-based courses and comprehensive language learning kits for adults and children.

Languages Offered 

Living Language offers 28 languages, including 27 oral and one sign language, that are: Arabic, Chinese, Croatian, Czech, Dothraki, Dutch, English, Persian, French, German, Greek, Hebrew, Hindi, Hungarian, Irish, Italian, Japanese, Korean, Polish, Portuguese, Russian, Spanish, Swahili, Swedish, Tagalog, Thai, Turkish, Vietnamese and American Sign Language.

External links 
 Living Language's website
 Watch Your Language (blog)

References

Publishing companies of the United States
Publishing companies established in 1946
1946 establishments in the United States